Ryan Walters (born January 21, 1986) is an American football coach and former safety, who is the current head football coach for the Purdue Boilermakers. He played college football for Colorado from 2004 to 2008. He then served as the defensive coordinator for the Missouri Tigers (2018–2020) and the Illinois Fighting Illini (2021–2022).

Walters was born in Los Angeles, California. His father, Marc, was a quarterback for Colorado. He attended Grandview High School in Aurora, Colorado. After graduation from high school, he accepted a football scholarship to the University of Colorado Boulder. After spending his freshman season as a redshirt, he converted from quarterback to safety. He started for three seasons, helping the Buffaloes to two bowl games, earning honorable mention All-Big 12 Conference as a senior.

After going undrafted in the 2009 NFL Draft, Walters turned to coaching, eventually being named the youngest (25 years old) position coach in the Pac-10 Conference during the 2011 season. After various stops along the way, Walters was promoted to defensive coordinator for the Missouri Tigers (2018–2020) and the Illinois Fighting Illini (2021–2022). On December 13, 2022, he was named the 37th head coach in the history of Purdue University.

Early life
Walters was born in Los Angeles, California to parents Marc and Nicole. Soon after his birth, his father had accepted a scholarship to play quarterback for the Colorado Buffaloes. During his father's playing days, his babysitter was National Football League coach Eric Bieniemy. After his father's playing days, he grew up in Aurora, Colorado, while his father worked as a lawyer for Qwest.

Playing career 
Walters attended Grandview High School, where he played quarterback. As a junior in 2002, he threw for 1,582 yards and 15 touchdowns, while also running for 478 yards and 11 scores before a meniscus tear ended his season. As a senior in 2003, he broke the Grandview record for career touchdown passes, 36, a record that stood until 2020. The spring before his senior season, Walters committed to play college football at Colorado and head coach Gary Barnett. As a senior, he racked up 1,549 passing yards (59.2 completion percentage, 14 TDs), limiting his running as he played hurt a good portion of the season as he played in just nine games.

Freshman season (2005)

Walters was able to graduate high school early in December, and enrolled at the University of Colorado in January 2004. He entered his true freshman season as the sixth quarterback on the Buffaloes' depth chart. After an illness kept him out of most of the spring practices, he was asked to move to safety to help the team prepare. His play impressed the Colorado coaching staff so much, that he was moved to the defensive side of the ball permanently. He took the fall of his true freshman season to redshirt and gain muscle. As a redshirt freshman he played in 9 games. For the 2005 season, he recorded 16 tackles with his season high of four coming against Texas in the 2005 Big 12 Championship Game. Walters also recorded three pass breakups and two quarterback hurries.

Sophomore season (2006)

In 2006, as a sophomore, Walters claimed a starting safety position for the Buffaloes. Against Texas Tech, he recorded both his first and second interceptions. As a result, he was awarded the Big 12 Conference defensive player of the week. Against Kansas, Walters recorded his first collegiate touchdown, with a 95-yard fumble recovery. He had a season-high 11 tackles against Arizona State.

Junior season (2007)

Walters was a preseason first-team All-Big 12 selection by both Athlon and The Sporting News. In week 1, Walters established what would end up being a career high, 16 tackles against Colorado State. Against #3 Oklahoma, Walters intercepted a pass from quarterback Sam Bradford, which lead to an touchdown on the ensuing drive. In the 2007 Independence Bowl, he had an interception, setting up Colorado's first touchdown of the bowl.

Senior season (2008)

Walters entered his senior year as the starter at free safety. He was named a preseason third team All-Big 12 by Phil Steele’s College Football and voted a team captain by his teammates. He opened the season with 10 tackles and an interceptions against Colorado State. Against Iowa State, Walters tied his career-high with 16 tackles. He finished the season with honorable mention All-Big 12 honors, first-team All-Colorado honors from the state's National Football Foundation and was voted that seasons team MVP by his teammates. He finished his career with 5 interceptions. Walters graduated from Colorado in 2008 with a degree in history. He went undrafted in the 2009 NFL Draft, and returned to Colorado to continue his education.

College statistics

Coaching career

Early career
Walters began his coaching career as a student assistant at Colorado, working with the secondary in 2009. He then moved to Arizona, where he spent one season as a graduate assistant in 2010, and was promoted to defensive backs coach for the 2011 season. At the time of his promotion, he was the youngest assistant coach in the Pac-10 Conference, at the age of 25. In 2012, Walters worked as a graduate assistant under Bob Stoops at Oklahoma, as the Sooners went 10–3 and played in the 2013 Cotton Bowl. Walters then spent one season as cornerbacks coach at North Texas under head coach Dan McCarney in 2013. The team would end up playing in 2014 Heart of Dallas Bowl. He spent the 2014 season as the cornerbacks coach for the Memphis Tigers helping them reach the 2014 Miami Beach Bowl.

Missouri
Walters then followed Barry Odom from Memphis to Missouri to join Gary Pinkel's Missouri staff in February of 2015 as safeties coach. Following Pinkel's retirement, and Odom's promotion to head coach, Walters was promoted to co-defensive coordinator and safeties coach in 2016. On December 8, 2017, Odom promoted Walters to full-time defensive coordinator in 2018 in addition to serving as the secondary coach. He was a holdover after the 2020 coaching change to Eliah Drinkwitz.

Illinois
In January 2021, a report surfaced that Walters was among three finalists to join Bret Bielema's new staff at Illinois. The other finalists were reportedly Oklahoma State defensive coordinator Jim Knowles, and Arkansas defensive coordinator Barry Odom, Walters' former boss at Missouri. Odom eventually elected to stay with Arkansas, and on January 6, 2021, Walters was announced as the new DC for the Illini. In 2022, the Illini defense under Walters was 2nd nationally in points allowed, 3rd in total defense, 3rd in yards per play, 1st in interceptions, and 1st in takeaways. Walters was named a finalist for the 2022 Broyles Award, celebrating the nation's top coordinator.

Purdue
On December 13, 2022, Purdue announced Walters as the 37th head coach in program history. At the time of his hiring, Walters ranked as the 4th youngest coach in the FBS. His new contract with Purdue is for 5 years.

Head coaching record

Family 
Walters and his wife Tara have two sons, Aaron and Cason.

References

External links
 Illinois profile

1985 births
Living people
American football safeties
Arizona Wildcats football coaches
Colorado Buffaloes football coaches
Colorado Buffaloes football players
Illinois Fighting Illini football coaches
Memphis Tigers football coaches
Missouri Tigers football coaches
North Texas Mean Green football coaches
Oklahoma Sooners football coaches
Purdue Boilermakers football coaches
Coaches of American football from California
Players of American football from Los Angeles
Sports coaches from Los Angeles
African-American coaches of American football
African-American players of American football
20th-century African-American sportspeople
21st-century African-American sportspeople